The women's disc golf was one of the events in flying disc at the 2001 World Games in Akita. It was played from 17 to 18 August. The competition took place at Akita Prefectural Central Park Disc Golf Course.

Competition format
A total of 6 athletes entered the competition. In preliminary stage they play round-robin tournament on 9 holes. Athletes on the first and second place advances to gold medal match. Athletes on the third and four place advances to bronze medal match. In final rounds athletes have to play 18 holes.

Results

Preliminary stage

Finals
 Fifth place match

 Third place match

 Final

References

External links
 Results on IWGA website

Flying disc at the 2001 World Games